Baczki may refer to the following places in Masovian Voivodeship, Poland:
Baczki, Sokołów County
Baczki, Węgrów County 
Bączki, Garwolin County